Kononfla (also spelled Konéfla) is a town in central Ivory Coast. It is a sub-prefecture of Sinfra Department in Marahoué Region, Sassandra-Marahoué District.

Kononfla was a commune until March 2012, when it became one of 1126 communes nationwide that were abolished.

In 2021, the population of the sub-prefecture of Kononfla was 55,427.

Villages
The 13 villages of the sub-prefecture of Kononfla and their population in 2014 are:

Notes

Sub-prefectures of Marahoué
Former communes of Ivory Coast